St. Mary's Episcopal Church, or variants thereof, may refer to:

Scotland
St Mary's Episcopal Church, Dunblane

United States
 St. Mary's-on-the-Highlands Episcopal Church, Birmingham, Alabama
 St. Mary's Episcopal Church (Jasper, Alabama), in Jasper, Alabama
 St. Mary's Episcopal Church (Phoenix), Arizona
 St. Mary's Episcopal Church (Monticello, Arkansas), listed on the NRHP in Drew County, Arkansas
 St. Mary's Episcopal Church (Bridgeville, Delaware)
 St. Mary's Episcopal Church (Green Cove Springs, Florida), NRHP-listed in Clay County
 St. Mary's Episcopal Church (Madison, Florida), NRHP-listed
 St. Mary's Episcopal Church and Rectory (Milton, Florida), NRHP-listed
 St. Mary’s Episcopal Church (Athens, Georgia)
 St. Mary's Episcopal Church (Emmett, Idaho), listed on the NRHP in Idaho
 St. Mary's Episcopal Church (Middlesboro, Kentucky), NRHP-listed
 St. Mary's Episcopal Church (Franklin, Louisiana), NRHP-listed
 St. Mary's Episcopal Church (Weyanoke, Louisiana), NRHP-listed
 St. Mary's Episcopal Church/Woodlawn, Woodlawn, Maryland, NRHP-listed
 St. Mary's Episcopal Church (Dorchester, Massachusetts), NRHP-listed
 St. Mary's Episcopal Church (Newton Lower Falls, Massachusetts)
 St. Mary's Episcopal Church (Fayette, Missouri), NRHP-listed
 St. Mary's Episcopal Church (Kansas City, Missouri), NRHP-listed
 St. Mary's Episcopal Church (Burlington, New Jersey), NRHP-listed
 Saint Mary's Episcopal Church, Briarcliff Manor, New York, contributing property of the NRHP in Westchester County, New York
 St. Mary's Episcopal Church (Brooklyn), NRHP-listed
 St. Mary's Episcopal Church (Springfield Center, New York)
 St. Mary's Episcopal Church (Asheville, North Carolina)
 St. Mary's Episcopal Church (West Jefferson, North Carolina)
 Saint Mary's Episcopal Church and Parish House, Hillsboro, Ohio, NRHP-listed
 Saint Mary's Church, Hamilton Village, Philadelphia, Pennsylvania, an Episcopal church
 St. Mary's Episcopal Church (Elverson, Pennsylvania), NRHP-listed
 St. Mary's Episcopal Church (East Providence, Rhode Island), NRHP-listed
 St. Mary's Episcopal Church (Flandreau, South Dakota), NRHP-listed
 St. Mary's Episcopal Church (Washington, D.C.), NRHP-listed
 St. Mary's Episcopal Church (Provo, Utah)

See also
St. Mary's Church (disambiguation)